Gilbert Kymer (died 1463) was Dean of Salisbury Cathedral, Chancellor of Oxford University, and a physician.

Kymer was educated at the University of Oxford. He was a proctor of the University (1412–13) and Principal of Hart Hall, Oxford (1412–14). He was twice Chancellor of Oxford University.

In 1423, Kymer attempted to found a conjoint college of surgeons and physicians with John Somerset and Thomas Morstede. The plans for this collapsed in November 1424. In 1427, Kymer became Dean of Wimborne Minster (in Dorset). In 1449, he became Dean of Salisbury (in Wiltshire), where he occupied Leaden Hall. He was the physician in the household of Humphrey of Lancaster, 1st Duke of Gloucester. He attended King Henry VI as a physician in 1455.

References

 

Year of birth unknown
1463 deaths
Alumni of the University of Oxford

Deans of Salisbury
Chancellors of the University of Oxford
15th-century English medical doctors
15th-century English scientists
Principals of Hart Hall, Oxford